The 2012–13 Armenian First League season began on 10 April 2012 and finished on 13 May 2013.

Overview
Alashkert FC returned to professional football.
King Delux joined the league.

League table

See also
 2012–13 Armenian Premier League
 2012–13 Armenian Cup

References

 

Armenian First League seasons
2012–13 in Armenian football
Armenia